James W. Wright  was executive director of the Development Authority of the North Country, a position he held for 11 years until his retirement in 2020. Previously he had been a member of the New York State Senate, representing the 48th district. This district includes Oswego and Jefferson counties, as well as part of St. Lawrence County.

Prior to his election, he had been county administrator for Oswego County and later Jefferson County. A Republican, he announced his retirement from elected office in December 2007, and was succeeded in a special election by Democrat Darrel Aubertine.

References

Year of birth missing (living people)
Living people
Politicians from Watertown, New York
State University of New York at Oswego alumni
Syracuse University alumni
Republican Party New York (state) state senators